Varmazyar-e Sofla (also Romanized as Varmazyār-e Soflá; also known as Varmaziar and Varmazyār) is a village in Qareh Poshtelu-e Pain Rural District, Qareh Poshtelu District, Zanjan County, Zanjan Province, Iran. At the 2006 census, its population was 97, in 23 families.

References 

Populated places in Zanjan County